The 2016 FIBA World Olympic Qualifying Tournament for Women was a women's basketball tournament that consisted of 12 national teams, where the top five teams earned a place in the 2016 Summer Olympics basketball tournament. It was held from 13 to 19 June 2016. France hosted the tournament in the city of Nantes.

Belarus, China, France, Spain and Turkey qualified for the 2016 Summer Olympics.

Format
The 12 teams were divided into four groups (Groups A–D) for the preliminary round. The top two teams from each group qualified for the knockout round. All four quarterfinal winners advanced to the medal rounds; the four quarterfinal losers played two rounds to allocate the final slot.

Hosts selection
On 26 September 2015, FIBA announced that France and Spain were the candidates to host the women's qualification tournaments. The deadline to submit the final candidature was set on 11 November, following which an evaluation of all bids would take place. France was announced as host of the Olympic qualifier on 19 January 2016.

Squads

Qualification

Draw
The draw was held at 26 January 2016 at the FIBA headquarters in Mies, Switzerland.

Referees
The following referees were selected for the tournament.

 Gentian Cici
 Andreia Silva
 Maripier Malo
 Nicolas Maestre
 Yohan Rosso
 Snehal Bendke
 Amit Balak
 Sarty Nghixulifwa
 Julio Anaya
 Tomasz Trawicki
 Hatim Al-Harbi
 Jasmina Juras
 Amy Bonner
 Joyce Muchenu

Preliminary round

Group A

Group B

Group C

Group D

Knockout round
The four quarterfinal winners and the winner of the fifth place game qualified for the 2016 Summer Olympics.

Quarterfinals

Semifinals

Fifth place game

Final ranking

Statistical leaders

Players

Points

Rebounds

Assists

Steals

Blocks

Other statistical leaders

Teams

Points

Rebounds

Assists

Steals

Blocks

See also
Basketball at the 2016 Summer Olympics
2016 FIBA World Olympic Qualifying Tournaments for Men

References

External links
Official website

 
FIBA World Olympic Qualifying Tournament for Women
Qual
2016 in women's basketball
2015–16 in French basketball
International women's basketball competitions hosted by France
Sport in Nantes
basketball